Geolycosa xera, or Mccrone's burrowing wolf spider, is a species of wolf spider (Lycosidae) endemic to Florida in the United States.

Subspecies
These two subspecies belong to the species Geolycosa xera:
 Geolycosa xera archboldi McCrone, 1963 i c g b
 Geolycosa xera xera McCrone, 1963 i g
Data sources: i = ITIS, c = Catalogue of Life, g = GBIF, b = Bugguide.net

References

Lycosidae
Articles created by Qbugbot
Spiders described in 1963